General elections were held in the Dominican Republic on 16 May 1934. Two years earlier, the Dominican Party of President Rafael Trujillo had been declared the only legally permitted party. However, the country had effectively been a one-party state since Trujillo assumed office in 1930.

Trujillo was the only candidate in the presidential election and was elected unopposed, whilst the Dominican Party won every seat in the Congressional elections. There was also an election for a Constitutional Assembly, whose role was to amend certain articles of the constitution.

Results

References

Dominican Republic
1934 in the Dominican Republic
Elections in the Dominican Republic
One-party elections
Single-candidate elections
Presidential elections in the Dominican Republic
Election and referendum articles with incomplete results
May 1934 events